Hell's Highway is a 2002 American horror film written and directed by Jeff Leroy.

Plot 

Out on a highway in Death Valley, a man picks up a female hitchhiker named Lucindia, and gives her a drink. Lucindia has a coughing fit upon ingesting the liquid, stumbles out of the vehicle, and is stabbed to death by the motorist. The man (revealed to be a priest, whose offer to Lucindia was holy water) buries Lucindia's body, and erects a crucifix over the impromptu grave. As the preacher prays, Lucindia reappears, and bludgeons him with his shovel as he screams, "El Diablo!"

Nearby, four college students (Eric, Chris, Monique, and Sarah) from Western Pennsylvania are on a road trip to Redondo Beach. Spotting Lucindia at a cluster of crosses, the quartet pick her up. When Chris mentions that a group of their friends are also on their way to Redondo, Lucindia brags that she tortured them to death before pulling out a gun and sexually assaulting Sarah. Lucindia then tries to shoot Sarah in the crotch, but is knocked out of the car by her and Eric.

The next day, Lucindia (who had just robbed, castrated, and murdered a motorist) catches up with the college students, who run her down, beheading and disemboweling her. On what's left of Lucindia's body, Eric finds Chris's brother's cell phone, and a battery pack that fits into a camcorder that Sarah had earlier unearthed in the desert. The group watches the last few minutes recorded by the camera, which shows Lucindia shooting all of their friends during a botched séance. Lucindia then turns to the camera and tells the story of a settler couple that became trapped in the valley; to try and save his wife (implied to be Lucindia), the husband killed himself so that she could consume his flesh. Her husband's body was not enough to sustain her, and in her last dying hours the woman cursed God and prayed to the Devil for salvation, and received it in exchange for a steady stream of victims.

When the video ends, Lucindia appears, and attacks and mortally wounds Chris with a chainsaw. The students drive off, with Lucindia catching up to them when they run out of gas. Sarah, Eric, and Monique run, but are cornered by a pair of Lucindias, who murder Monique. Sarah accidentally kills Eric, then kills one of the Lucindias and is saved from the remaining one by two government operatives, who then capture Sarah.

Sarah is taken to a military installation, where it is explained that there were four equally delusional Lucindias and that they were the result of cloning and accelerated growth experiments. The staff tell Sarah that she is going to become their new test subject and as they try to give her an injection, a wounded Lucindia barges in. Sarah screams "I told you the Devil would come back!" as Lucindia opens fire with a shotgun, causing an explosion that presumably kills her and everyone else in the room.

Cast 

 Phoebe Dollar as Lucindia/Nurse Polonia
 Kiren David as Sarah McKinnis
 Hank Horner as Eric
 Beverly Lynne as Monique
 Jonathan Gray as Chris Struther
 Ron Jeremy as Jack
 Joe Haggerty as Preacher
 Garrett Clancy as Doctor Sullivan
 Brian C. Donnelly as Ralph Struther
 Jackie Johnson as Julie
 Jennifer Warren as Carla
 Natalie Pierre as Debra

Reception 

Joe Bob Briggs gave Hell's Highway a score of 2½ stars out of a possible 4, and wrote, "The acting is uneven, but the story does satisfy the first rule of drive-in movie-making: anybody can die at any moment. And you've gotta love a movie that has a sequence with porn legend Ron Jeremy as a bitter film producer who picks up the diabolical hitchhiker and is rewarded by getting disemboweled with a butcher knife while he's driving". Bruce Kooken of Horror News was highly critical of the film's twist ending, but still categorized Hell's Highway as "campy, funny and, without question, a blast" and summed up his closing thoughts regarding it with, "Just because I was disappointed with the ending doesn't mean there isn't plenty of entertaining aspects of the film".

References

External links 

 
 

2002 films
2000s chase films
American road movies
American slasher films
Demons in film
American splatter films
2000s teen horror films
2002 horror films
Films about cloning
American serial killer films
Films set in deserts
Films about telepathy
Mass murder in fiction
Films set in California
2002 independent films
Films about vacationing
Films shot in California
2002 direct-to-video films
American independent films
American teen horror films
Direct-to-video horror films
Films based on urban legends 
American direct-to-video films
2000s science fiction horror films
American science fiction horror films
Direct-to-video science fiction films
Supernatural slasher films
2000s English-language films
2000s American films